The 2016 Southeastern United States wildfires were a series of wildfires in the Southeastern United States in October and November 2016.

Context

Firefighters from 21 states including Washington and Oregon were part of the effort to fight the blazes. North Carolina Governor Pat McCrory said 1600 firefighters fought 19 fires in his state, at a cost of $10 million since October 23. Arson is believed to be responsible for several fires in the Nantahala National Forest where 46,000 acres had burned as of November 18. The Asheville Regional Airport reported no rain for ten days after October 8, 2016, after which the area was considered to be in severe drought, while Cherokee, Clay and Macon Counties were considered to be in extreme drought. A month later these three counties and Graham and part of Swain were in exceptional drought, and ten other counties were in extreme drought.

As of December 8, even after rain, much of Georgia and Alabama continued to be in exceptional drought, while Tennessee and the western Carolinas were in extreme drought.

Lightning and accidental human activity such as campfires may have started some fires. Poor air quality was an issue in Asheville and other parts of western North Carolina.

Western North Carolina fires

The Boteler Fire in Clay County, North Carolina began October 25 and had burned  as of November 18.
 
The Party Rock Fire in North Carolina, which McCrory called number two in the country, began November 5 and as of November 18 had burned  and resulted in the evacuation of 1000 people in the areas of Bat Cave, Chimney Rock and Lake Lure. People were allowed to return to Chimney Rock on November 21, 10 days after they left. Firefighters who came mostly from the eastern part of the state had watched buildings in the towns while local fire departments covered their areas. Lake Lure was the headquarters for operations.

On November 30 a man was arrested for setting two Macon County fires.

As of December 6, substantial rain had helped greatly in the effort to bring under control as many as 34 fires which had burned 60,000 acres.

North Georgia fires
The Rough Ridge fire in the Cohutta Wilderness of Georgia, believed to have started from a lightning strike October 16, 2016, had burned almost  by November 20, making it one of the largest fires ever in Georgia.

East Tennessee fires

On November 11, 2016, a Chattanooga man was arrested for setting three separate fires north and west of the city. Over 500 acres had been burned in connection with these fires.

Governor Bill Haslam issued a burn ban for 51 counties starting on November 14 through December 15.

On November 16, 2016, two men were arrested for arson in separate wildfire incidents in Tennessee. In Sequatchie County, an Alabama man admitted to dropping a cigarette in a pile of leaves, watching it burn and leaving without putting it out. In Monroe County, a resident was arrested for starting a burn on personal property, against the burn ban, that got out of control.

, Tennessee Division of Forestry reported 64 fires that had burned 17,734 acres. The largest was in Morgan County in the White Oak Circle area covered about 1900 acres but was contained. Another on Neddy Mountain in Cocke County had burned 1116 acres but was mostly contained.

By November 21, just 95 acres were reported still burning in Tennessee, and at least half of the state's fires were reported to be started in connection with arson.

On November 28, the Chimney Tops 2 fire in the Chimney Tops of the Great Smoky Mountains National Park spread with the aid of strong winds and dry conditions, the fire quickly broke into multiple fires and spread across the mountains above and around Gatlinburg, Tennessee. By the evening hours the fire had reached the downtown area of Gatlinburg, resulting in the evacuation of over 14,000 people, along with causing damage in and around the town. By November 29, the wildfires had claimed at least three lives. An additional four people were later confirmed dead the next day. As of December 4, the Chimney Tops 2 fire had burned 17,006 acres. A total of 14 people died and 134 others were injured in the Smoky Mountains fires, while over 2,400 structures were burned. Damages were totaled to over $500 Million.

On December 8, the burn ban was lifted for four of the 51 counties in Tennessee to aid cleanup of tornadoes that happened on November 29 in southeast Tennessee.

See also 
Droughts in California
List of wildfires

References

2016 in Georgia (U.S. state)
2016 in North Carolina
2016 in South Carolina
2016 in Tennessee
2016 natural disasters in the United States
2016 wildfires in the United States
Wildfires in the United States
Wildfires in Georgia (U.S. state)
Wildfires in North Carolina
Wildfires in South Carolina
Wildfires in Tennessee